
Gmina Nowa Sucha is a rural gmina (administrative district) in Sochaczew County, Masovian Voivodeship, in east-central Poland. Its seat is the village of Nowa Sucha, which lies approximately 9 kilometres (5 mi) south-west of Sochaczew and 57 km (35 mi) south-west of Warsaw.

Villages
Gmina Nowa Sucha contains the villages and settlements of Antoniew, Borzymówka, Braki, Glinki, Gradów, Kolonia Gradowska, Kornelin, Kościelna Góra, Kozłów Biskupi, Kozłów Szlachecki, Kurdwanów, Leonów, Marysinek, Mizerka, Nowa Sucha, Nowy Białynin, Nowy Dębsk, Nowy Kozłów Drugi, Nowy Kozłów Pierwszy, Nowy Żylin, Okopy, Orłów, Rokotów, Roztropna, Stara Sucha, Stary Białynin, Stary Dębsk, Stary Żylin, Szeligi, Wikcinek and Zakrzew.

Neighbouring gminas
Gmina Nowa Sucha is bordered by the town of Sochaczew and by the gminas of Bolimów, Kocierzew Południowy, Nieborów, Rybno, Sochaczew, Teresin and Wiskitki.

References
Polish official population figures 2006

Nowa Sucha
Sochaczew County